CSNY/Déjà Vu is a 2008 documentary film directed by Bernard Shakey, a pseudonym for Neil Young. It focuses on the career of Crosby, Stills, Nash & Young, its musical connection to its audience and the turbulent times with which its music is associated as the band goes on their 2006 Freedom of Speech tour.

It was shown as the closing film of the 2008 Sundance Film Festival.

Metrodome Distribution released CSNY/Déjà Vu on DVD in the UK on September 29, 2008. The DVD also features an exclusive interview with Neil Young and all ten Living with War music videos.

References

External links

2008 films
American rock music films
American independent films
Films directed by Neil Young
Crosby, Stills, Nash & Young
Roadside Attractions films
2000s English-language films
2000s American films